is a visual novel developed by the Japanese game company G.J?. It was adapted into a 3-episode hentai original video animation series produced by Milky. It is licensed by both Hustler Video and JapanAnime in United States. The first OVA was released on VHS and DVD simultaneously on June 25, 2004. The second was released on September 25, 2004. The third was released on June 25, 2006.

Plot
Shindou Nikita has a secret that he has been hiding for a long time—he loves hentai and h-games. He enters "The Alternative Trivia Research Club" where the first of his many sexual encounters takes place. Despite that, he finds out that both of his foster sisters are in love with him, and he has to make a choice—who does he really love. Nikita Shindou loves the world of animation more than anything; he puts his life into it. He has never fallen for a real, living girl, until the day he meets Ren Aoi. 

We're introduced to young man Nikita Shindou as he's making his way through Akihabara, which is his main haunt and the place where he gets all his bishōjo games, which he plays in his room all alone in the dark. Keeping them a secret from his sister who just moved in a few months ago after their parents had died, Nikita loves playing up the characters having sex with each other and manipulating them as he can. To his surprise on his way home though, he comes across a park he hadn't remembered before and sees a beautiful woman there, one that reminds him strikingly of an older Sheeta from Laputa: Castle in the Sky! Even more amazing is that she comes into his room in some sort of dream sequence not too much later and keeps calling him Pazu and the two fool around quite a bit only for it to end up as a dream.

Characters
 is the protagonist and is a college student. He is an "akiba-addict". His parents died when he was little in a car crash and he was saved by Ren when she was an angel. He has been living with Mei ever since.
 is a cosplayer and a member of the same club as Nikita. 
 is an older adopted sister of Nikita, which is why she has a different surname. She is drunk most of the time and seems to have feelings for Nikita, but this could be her just being drunk. 
 Ren is an angel, who had saved Nikita from the crash which killed his parents. Since this was changing the destiny of a human, which angels are forbidden to do, Ren is punished by God to live on the Earth temporarily neither as an angel or human. By the end of the episodes, it was time for her to leave Earth, as she had served out her sentence.  
 is the adopted little sister of Nikita. From living with Nikita for so long, she has developed feelings for him which he doesn't realise until Hatoko tells him. 
 has a tsundere personality. She is a voice actress and is also a member of the same club as Nikita.

References

Further reading

External links
  
 

2004 anime OVAs
Eroge
Hentai anime and manga
Visual novels